Uppu is a 1987 Indian Malayalam film, directed by V. K. Pavithran and written by K. M. A. Rahim. The film is about the atavistic Muslim practice of male polygamy. The film is entirely on the side of the wronged wives, mounting a strong criticism of this aspect of the Muslim religion. It stars P. T. Kunju Muhammed, Jayalalitha, Vijayan Kottarathil and Madhavan. The film won the National Film Award for Best Feature Film in Malayalam.

Plot
The story begins when old patriarch, Moosa Meleri arrives in a quiet Kerala village with his daughter Amina and adopted son-in-law Abu. He has lost all his money in litigation. Despite their hardships, they are happy until their rich landlord covets Amina. Heartbroken, Amina is forced to divorce Abu and become the landlord's second wife. Twenty years later, Amina is alone while her father still indulges in litigation, her son leads a dissolute life and her daughter elopes with the chauffeur.

Cast
 P. T. Kunju Muhammed as Abu 
 Jayalalita as Amina 
 Bharathi as Khadeeja
 Vijayan Kottarathil as Meleri Moosa
 Madhavan as Moidutty Mudalali 
 Sadiq as Saleem 
 Mullanezhi as Nanu Nair 
 Valsala Menon as Mariyambi  
 V. K. Sreeraman as Abdul Rahman Musaliyar
 C. V. Sreeraman as Khazi (religious leader)
 Preetha A as Abu's daughter

Controversies
The film was controversial as it dealt with a sensitive content. Pavithran's comments on the film are revealing: "Salt is a trifle better—the truth always is. The religious laws are almost unknowingly misused by people, leading to the exploitation of those who succumb or resign themselves to religious and social pressures. Our intention was not to victimise or ridicule the Muslim community. Why, in the second half of the film, we also expose a Nair family who run a prostitution den—but are particular about their prayers." Producer and writer K. M. A. Rahim stated, "The villain in the film is the distorted perception of Muslim personal law. When I wrote the script, I kept it in mimd that I must do my best to translate the reality I know on to the screen. That is why the film does not sound didactic. We did not intend to teach—the reality itself is thought provoking."

References

External links
 Uppu at the British Film Institute Movie Database
 

1980s Malayalam-language films
Films about polygamy
Polygamy in fiction
Best Malayalam Feature Film National Film Award winners